Quintus Fabius Maximus may refer to:

 Quintus Fabius Maximus (consul 213 BC), Roman senator
 Quintus Fabius Maximus (consul 45 BC), Roman senator
 Quintus Fabius Maximus Aemilianus, Roman senator
 Quintus Fabius Maximus Allobrogicus, Roman senator
 Quintus Fabius Maximus Eburnus, Roman senator
 Quintus Fabius Maximus Gurges (consul 292 BC), Roman senator
 Quintus Fabius Maximus Gurges (consul 265 BC), Roman senator
 Quintus Fabius Maximus Rullianus, Roman general
 Quintus Fabius Maximus Verrucosus ("Cunctator") (d. 203 BC), Roman general, two-time dictator

See also